Geoffrey Angier Huston (born November 8, 1957) is a retired American professional basketball player. He was a point guard for the New York Knicks, Dallas Mavericks, Cleveland Cavaliers, Golden State Warriors and Los Angeles Clippers. Collegiately, he played for the Texas Tech Red Raiders. The Dallas Mavericks traded Huston, along with a 1983 third round draft choice to the Cavaliers in exchange for Chad Kinch and a 1985 first round draft choice on February 7, 1981.

In eight NBA seasons, he played in 496 games, having played 12,252 minutes, and scoring 4,380 points. During his NBA career he managed a 48.3 field goal percentage (1,836 for 3,805), 25.4 three-point field goal percentage (16 for 63), 70.8 free throw percentage (692 for 978), 684 total rebounds (201 offensive, 483 defensive), 2,509 assists, 331 steals, 32 blocked shots, 899 turnovers and 844 personal fouls.

After retiring as a basketball player, Huston became the director of the St. Mary's Recreation Center in the Mott Haven section of the South Bronx in New York City.

See also
List of National Basketball Association players with most assists in a game

References

External links
NBA stats @ databasebasketball.com

1957 births
Living people
African-American basketball players
American men's basketball players
Basketball players from New York City
Canarsie High School alumni
Cleveland Cavaliers players
Dallas Mavericks expansion draft picks
Dallas Mavericks players
Golden State Warriors players
Los Angeles Clippers players
New York Knicks draft picks
New York Knicks players
Point guards
Shooting guards
Sportspeople from Brooklyn
Texas Tech Red Raiders basketball players
21st-century African-American people
20th-century African-American sportspeople